John C. Land III is a politician who is a former Democratic member of the South Carolina Senate, representing the 36th District from 1976 until 2013. He served in the South Carolina House of Representatives from 1975 to 1976.

Land attended University of South Carolina, where he became a member of the Sigma Chi fraternity, graduating in 1966. Land received his Juris Doctor from the University of South Carolina School of Law in 1968.

References

External links
South Carolina Legislature - Senator John C. Land III official SC Senate website
Project Vote Smart - Senator John C. Land III (SC) profile
John C. Land III Legal Bio
Follow the Money - John C. Land III
2006 2004 2002 2000 1996 campaign contributions

|-

|-

1941 births
Living people
Democratic Party South Carolina state senators
Democratic Party members of the South Carolina House of Representatives
People from Manning, South Carolina